Ashley Mansour (born January 24, 1985) is an American film producer, writer, and the founder and CEO of Monikher Productions.

Life and career 
Ashley Mansour is an author, writer and producer from Los Angeles, California. Her first feature film, Back Roads, starring Juliette Lewis and Alex Pettyfer, premiered as an Official Selection in the Spotlight Narrative section at the 2018 Tribeca Film Festival, and won first prize for Best Feature at the 2018 Rhode Island International Film Festival, and was an official selection at Heartland Film Festival. In 2019 won best drama feature at Stockholm Independent Film Festival.

Mansour's first novel, Blood, Ink and Fire was released in 2015 by Upturn Publishing and reaching Amazon Best Seller shortly after its release. In 2019 Mansour's next book, The Writing Success Code; 7-Day Guide hit Amazon Best Selling list again. Mansour has been a producer at Upturn Productions for four years. 

She set up her own production company in 2018, Monikher Productions with its upcoming adaption of Saving Beck, a novel by NY Times best-selling author Courtney Cox. In 2019. 

Mansour founded LA Writing Coach business.

Filmography

Works 
 Blood, Ink, and Fire (Los Angeles: Upturn, 2015)
 The Writing Success Code; 7-Day Guide (2019)

Personal life 
Mansour married Craig Robinson in 2016.

References 

American film producers
1985 births
Living people